The Newsletter: an Australian Paper for Australian People was an English-language broadsheet newspaper published weekly in Sydney, Australia by Charles John Haynes.  It was originally published as The Elector from 1890 to 1900.

History
The first issue of The Newsletter appeared on 15 September 1900, and it remained in print until 1919. The paper was published every Saturday. It continued a newspaper entitled  The Elector, which was also published in Sydney by Haynes between 1895 and 1900. The Elector began as a "bulletin of information for the electors of N.S.W.". However at the time it was continued by The Newsletter, it carried the sub-title "an up to date social, dramatic, sporting, political and general newspaper for the people".

Digitisation
Many issues of the paper have been digitised as part of the Australian Newspapers Digitisation Program, a project of the National Library of Australia in cooperation with the State Library of New South Wales.

See also
 List of newspapers in Australia
 List of newspapers in New South Wales

References

External links
 
 

Defunct newspapers published in Sydney
Newspapers on Trove